William Graham House may refer to:

in the United States
(by state)
William H. H. Graham House, Indianapolis, Indiana, NRHP-listed
William J. Graham House, Reno, Nevada, listed on the NRHP in Washoe County, Nevada
William A. Graham Jr. Farm, Kidville, North Carolina, listed on the NRHP in Lincoln County, North Carolina
William Graham House (Wayne, Ohio), listed on the NRHP in Wood County, Ohio

See also
Graham House (disambiguation)